Paul Collings (born 30 September 1968) is a former footballer who played as a goalkeeper. He represented Tranmere Rovers and Bury in the Football League, and also played for Ellesmere Port, Bury and Altrincham.

References

Tranmere Rovers F.C. players
Ellesmere Port Town F.C. players
Accrington Stanley F.C. players
English Football League players
Association football goalkeepers
1968 births
Living people
English footballers